Międzychód is a town in Greater Poland Voivodeship, Poland, the administrative seat of Międzychód County. Population is 10,915 (2009).

History

The town was first mentioned as Międzybrud (after Polish między, "between", bród, "ford") in a 1378 deed. It was a private town of Polish nobility, administratively located in the Poznań County in the Poznań Voivodeship in the Greater Poland Province of the Polish Crown. It was a settlement area for German artisans and merchants moving into the Polish lands from the adjacent Neumark region. In the 1793 Second Partition of Poland, Międzychód together with the bulk of Greater Poland was annexed by the Kingdom of Prussia as Birnbaum. In 1807 it was regained by Poles and included within the short-lived Duchy of Warsaw. In 1815 it was reannexed by Prussia, incorporated as the capital of the Kreis Birnbaum in the Regierungsbezirk of Posen, part of the Prussian Grand Duchy of Posen, and from 1871 to 1919 it was also part of Germany.

Upon the German defeat in World War I, the area was ceded to the newly established Second Polish Republic according to the 1919 Treaty of Versailles, with Międzychód as the westernmost town in Poland, administratively located in the Poznań Voivodeship. In the 1930s, the local German minority helped create a list of local Poles intended for persecution in the event of the German invasion and occupation. The town was again annexed by Nazi Germany and incorporated into the Reichsgau Wartheland upon the 1939 Invasion of Poland, which started World War II. The Germans carried out expulsions of Poles, whoses houses were then handed over to German colonists as part of the Lebensraum policy. Germany established and operated a Nazi prison in the town. In August 1944, the Germans carried out mass arrests of local members of the Home Army, the leading Polish underground resistance organization. Międzychód returned to Poland after World War II in 1945, while the German minority was expelled in accordance with the Potsdam Agreement.

In recent years the town's economy increasingly has relied as a resort for tourism on the surrounding lakes of the Warta valley.

Notable people
 Manuel Joël (1826–1890), rabbi and philosopher
 Hermann Tietz (1834–?), rabbi
 Hermann Tietz (1837–1907), merchant ("Hertie" department stores)
 Leonhard Tietz (1849–1914), his nephew, merchant ("Kaufhof")
 Oscar Tietz (1858–1923), his brother, merchant
 Lesser Ury (1861–1931), Impressionist painter
 Carl Hermann Busse (1872–1918), German lyric poet

References

External links

 Official town website

Cities and towns in Greater Poland Voivodeship
Międzychód County
Poznań Voivodeship (1921–1939)